Scrooge is a 1935 British Christmas fantasy film directed by Henry Edwards and starring Seymour Hicks, Donald Calthrop and Robert Cochran. Hicks appears as Ebenezer Scrooge, the miser who hates Christmas. It was the first sound version of the Charles Dickens classic A Christmas Carol, not counting a 1928 short subject that now appears to be lost. Hicks had previously played the role of Scrooge on the stage more than 2000 times beginning in 1901, and again in a 1913 British silent film version. This was the first film to be released by the Twickenham Film Distributors, Ltd., founded by Julius Hagen and Arthur Clavering. Hagen acted as producer for the new company, with Clavering handling film distribution.

Stylistically it leans heavily towards German Expressionism and the films of Fritz Lang, involving dark shadows and darkened edges.

The script sticks very closely to Dickens' words.

There is a colorized version that omits the opening scene in which Scrooge is solicited for a charitable donation.

Plot 
It is Christmas Eve of 1843: Ebenezer Scrooge (Sir Seymour Hicks), a cold-hearted and greedy elderly money-lender, is working in his freezing counting house along with his suffering, underpaid clerk Bob Cratchit (Donald Calthrop). Two businessmen (Charles Carson and Hubert Harben) arrive to collect a donation for the poor, but the old man responds that prisons and workhouses are sufficient resources to deal with poor people. Scrooge catches Bob trying to take some coal but warns him he will be out of a job if he does not go back to work. A visit from Fred (Robert Cochran), Scrooge's nephew and sole living relative, only incites further annoyance, with Scrooge refusing to dine with him and his wife, and claiming Christmas is 'Humbug!'.

That night after work, Bob goes home to celebrate the holidays with his family while Scrooge dines alone at a seedy pub while the lords and ladies of London celebrate Christmas with the Lord Mayor of London. At home, Scrooge encounters the ghost of his seven-year dead partner Jacob Marley (Claude Rains – whose voice is only heard) who wears a chain he 'forged in life' from his own wicked career. He tells Scrooge he will be haunted by three spirits in order to escape his fate.

That night, as Marley warned, Scrooge is haunted by the Ghost of Christmas Past (Marie Ney), who shows Scrooge when he lost his fiancée due to his greedy nature towards others including a debt-ridden couple. Scrooge then sees that his ex-fiancée Belle (Mary Glynne) is now married and has many children.

The next sprit, the Ghost of Christmas Present (Oscar Asche), shows Scrooge just how poor Bob and his family are as they have a meagre Christmas dinner of goose and pudding. The spirit threatens that unless the future changes, Tiny Tim (Philip Frost), the youngest son, who is ill, will die. Scrooge then sees how others keep Christmas before seeing Fred celebrate with his wife and friends.

The Ghost of Christmas Yet to Come (C.V. France) shows Scrooge what lies in store the following year. Scrooge discovers Tim is dead and that the man that was robbed and spoken of by some businessmen was himself after seeing his grave.

Scrooge returns a changed and generous person. He orders a turkey for Bob and his family, gives a healthy donation to the two men from the day before and dines with Fred. Scrooge raises Bob's wages and gives him the day off, telling him that he will be a godfather to Tim before the two attend church together. The congregation sing Hark! The Herald Angels Sing as they enter.

Cast 

 Sir Seymour Hicks as Ebenezer Scrooge
 Donald Calthrop as Bob Cratchit
 Robert Cochran as Fred
 Mary Glynne as Belle
 Garry Marsh as Belle's husband
 Oscar Asche as Spirit of Christmas Present
 Marie Ney as Spirit of Christmas Past (physical outline only)
 C. V. France as Spirit of Christmas Future
 Athene Seyler as Scrooge's charwoman
 Maurice Evans as Poor man
 Mary Lawson as Poor man's wife
 Barbara Everest as Mrs. Cratchit
 Eve Gray as Fred's wife
 Morris Harvey as Poulterer with Prize Turkey
 Philip Frost as Tiny Tim
 D.J. Williams as Undertaker
 Margaret Yarde as Scrooge's laundress
 Hugh E. Wright as Old Joe
 Charles Carson as Middlemark
 Hubert Harben as Worthington
 Claude Rains as Jacob Marley (voice, uncredited)
 Robert Morley as Rich man (uncredited)

Differences between adaptations 
The 1935 film differs from all other versions of the story in one significant way – most of the tormented spirits, including that of Jacob Marley, are not actually shown onscreen, although their voices are heard. Only Christmas Present is actually seen in full figure – Christmas Past is a mere shape with no discernible facial features, Marley's Ghost is seen only briefly as a face on the door knocker, and Christmas Yet to Come is simply an outstretched pointing finger.

Hicks plays both the old and young Scrooge. Albert Finney (in the 1970 film Scrooge) and Jim Carrey (in the 2009 film A Christmas Carol)  are the only others to play both young and old Scrooge on film.

The story is also severely truncated. Much time is spent at the beginning – before any of the ghosts appear – setting up the atmosphere of rich and poor London. Scrooge's sister Fan and Fezziwig are completely omitted from this version.

This is the first of only two sound versions in which Tiny Tim is actually depicted lying dead. In the Christmas Yet to Come sequence, Bob grieves at Tim's bedside. The 1999 television adaptation also contains this scene.

Maurice Evans appears briefly as a man harassed by Scrooge to pay his debts. Donald Calthrop portrays a Bob Cratchit who bears an uncanny physical resemblance to John Leech's illustrations of the character in the original 1843 edition of the novel.

Two versions of this adaptation exist; each has a differently designed opening credits sequence (a book and a metal plate), and one of the two omits the last scenes.

For years, it was kept out of circulation, due to the extremely poor quality of most of the surviving prints. However, it can be found on video sites such as YouTube.

See also
 Adaptations of A Christmas Carol
 List of Christmas films
 List of ghost films

References

External links 

 
 
 

1935 films
1930s fantasy drama films
1930s historical films
Films set in 1843
1930s ghost films
1930s Christmas drama films
British Christmas films
British fantasy drama films
British historical fantasy films
British black-and-white films
Films based on A Christmas Carol
Films directed by Henry Edwards
Paramount Pictures films
Films shot at Twickenham Film Studios
Films set in London
1935 drama films
1930s English-language films
1930s British films